The 2015–16 Biathlon World Cup – World Cup 8 was held in Presque Isle, Maine, United States, from 11 February until 13 February 2016.

Schedule of events

Medal winners

Men

Women

References 

2015–16 Biathlon World Cup
Biathlon World Cup
Biathlon World Cup
Presque Isle, Maine
February 2016 sports events in the United States
Biathlon competitions in the United States
Sports competitions in Maine